Walter Brewer (June 1821 – December 25, 1900) was a 19th-century American harbor pilot who guided large vessels into and out of New York Harbor as a Sandy Hook pilot. He was part owner of the pilot boats  Virginia,  William H. Aspinwall and the  America, of the New York fleet.

Early life

Brewer was born in St Albans, England in June 1821. He came to America on March 30, 1847.  He married Elizabeth Brewer around 1845 and had three children. Their daughter, Grace J. Brewer, married, had a son named Walter Brewer Duncuff, which was Brewer's grandson.

Career

By 1850, Brewer is listed as a pilot in water transportation living in New York City. He had three children. In early 1860, Brewer was a New York Sandy Hook pilot. He was part owner of the pilot boats  Virginia,  William H. Aspinwall and  America, of the New York and Sandy Hook fleet. He was a veteran of the American Civil War (1861-1865).

Virginia

On March 7, 1860, the New York pilot boat Virginia, No. 3, ran ashore in thick fog and gale ten miles east of  Rockaway Shoals. The crew was able to escape to safety. The boat was owned by pilots Walter Brewer, Thomas Morley, William Rock, George Burgess, and Ralph Altkins.

William H. Aspinwall

The pilot boat William H. Aspinwall, No. 21, built in 1861, was a replacement for the former pilot boat Virginia. Captain Walter Brewer was part owner and in command of the Aspinwall. The William H. Aspinwall, was registered as a pilot schooner with the Record of American and Foreign Shipping, from 1877 to 1879. Her ship master was Captain Walter Brewer; her owners were the N. Y. Pilots; built in 1861 in New York; her hailing port was the Port of New York.

On April 20, 1880, the 19 years old pilot schooner William H. Aspinwall, No. 21 of New York, was returning to port after all her pilots had boarded steamships when she was caught in a thick fog. She sailed one mile from the Fire Island Lighthouse and hit the outer Long Island bar. She was a total loss. A lifesaving crew reached the boat and rescued the pilot crew. Captain Walter Brewer commanded the lost boat.

America 

On October 25, 1880, a New York pilot boat America, No. 21, replaced the William H. Aspinwall, No. 21, due to her loss in April 1880. Captain Brewer was part owner of the pilot boat America. The America, No. 21, was registered with the Record of American and Foreign Shipping from 1882 to 1900 to the N.Y. Pilots as owners and Walter Brewer as Captain.

Sandy Hook Pilot Boat company

In 1883, Brewer was friends with Captain Joseph Henderson, Henry Seguine, William J. Barry, and Captain Josiah Johnson. On August 30, 1883, they started the Sandy Hook Pilot Boat Company to have ownership and control of vessels and equipment for the use of pilots in the New York Harbor and water ways of Sandy Hook. They received a certificate of incorporation from Albany, New York. The capital stock raised was $100,000, which was to be invested in pilot boats and other equipment. Their office was in Burling-slip in New York City. There was opposition to the project as it was seen as forming a union. The new Sandy Hook Pilot Boat company intended to influence legislation of a bill to reduce the pilot fees. The reduction of fees for pilotage had been on the table in earlier years. In November 1879, Brewer, Johnson and Augustus Van Pelt were on a committee to confer with merchants and shipowners regarding the pilotage charges.

Brewer's wife, Elizabeth, died on August 15, 1883, in Cornwallville, New York at age 65. In June 1990, Brewer was living with his daughter Grace Turner Brewer-Duncuff at 570 Park Place, Brooklyn, New York.

On September 3, 1890, Captain Brewer was at the launch of the New York pilot-boat David T. Leahy from the C. & R. Poillon shipyard at Clinton Street, Brooklyn, New York. The launch was witnessed by over thousand people. She was said to be the fastest of the twenty-eight pilot-boats in the New York and New Jersey fleet.

Brewer was elected Secretary of the New York Sandy Hook Pilots' Charitable Fund on February 8, 1893. The charitable fund provided pensions to pilots, burials, etc. Another notable officer elected was Electus Comfort.

Death

On December 25, 1900, Brewer, age 79, died of pneumonia. Funeral services were on December 27 at the residence of his daughter, Grace Brewer Duncuff at 570 Park Place, Brooklyn. He was buried at the Green-Wood Cemetery in Brooklyn.

See also
List of Northeastern U. S. Pilot Boats

References

  

  

1826 births
1900 deaths
Sea captains
Maritime pilotage
Burials at Green-Wood Cemetery
People from Brooklyn